The rivière des Vases (in English: rivières of vases) flows in the municipalities of Saint-Arsène, Cacouna and L'Isle-Verte, in the Rivière-du-Loup Regional County Municipality (MRC), in the administrative region of Bas-Saint-Laurent, in Quebec, in Canada.

The Rivière des Vases is a tributary of the south shore of the St. Lawrence River near L'Isle-Verte.

Geography 
The Rivière des Vases takes its source from agricultural streams located to the south-east of a peat bog area in the municipality of Saint-Arsène.

  north-west in Saint-Arsène, then north, until you reach a road;
  north, up to the limit of the municipality of Cacouna;
  north-west in Cacouna, up to the limit of the municipality of L'Isle-Verte;
  northeasterly, up to route 132;
  northward, collecting the waters of the Petit Lac stream (coming from the southwest), to the confluence of the Réal-Filion stream;
  north-west, to Chemin de la Rivière-des-Vases;
  to the north, where the river flows into a small bay which gradually widens to the confluence of the river.

Toponymy 
According to the Commission de toponymie du Québec, the name of this watercourse has appeared at least since 1925 on or in certain documents, cartographic and others. The origin of the toponym refers to the muddy character of several segments of this river, particularly at its confluence. The straightness of certain segments of its course is dependent on the application of provincial policies of digging small watercourses to increase the efficiency of agricultural land.

The toponym “rivière des Vases” was made official on December 5, 1968, at the Commission de toponymie du Québec.

See also 

 List of rivers of Quebec

References 

Rivers of Bas-Saint-Laurent
Regional county municipalities in Bas-Saint-Laurent